The Norwegian Judo Federation ( - NJF) is the national federation of judo in Norway. The chairman is Vibeke Thiblin (since 2009) and the deputy chairman is Harald Monsen. The Norwegian Judo Federation was founded in 1967.
The organisation's headquarters are in Oslo. It is an affiliate of the International Judo Federation.

Overview

In 2002 the Norwegian Judo Federation started training Afghan judokas under an exchange program with the Afghan Judo Federation established that year with the federation slogan "Judo for Peace". What began as a modest effort took on a big scale as increasingly more Afghan children and teenagers enrolled in the training program, the demand rising further. The project's objective also included giving priority to the underprivileged girls and women of Afghanistan, who showed equal interest and enthusiasm to their male counterparts. The result was a historic first: Freba Razzey became the first ever Afghan female to participate in an Olympic competition (in 2004).

Besides organizing international exchange programs, the Norwegian Judo Federation, a member of both the European Judo Union and the International Judo Federation (IJF), has been actively participating in international conventions. In 2010, it participated in the "Judo for Peace Event" hosted by the IJF in Jaipur, India.

Organization 

 Chairman : Vibeke Thiblin
 Deputy chairman : Harald Monsen

Chairmen of the NJF

Norwegian judoka
Mette Johansen (born in 1989)
Martin Thiblin

See also

European Judo Union

References

External links
 

Sports organizations established in 1967
1967 establishments in Norway
Judo
Judo organizations
National members of the International Judo Federation